Jerry Lawson (born July 2, 1966) is a former American long-distance runner who held a national record in the marathon. In 1993, Lawson set a course record of 2:10:27 while winning the California International Marathon.

Achievements

References 

1966 births
Living people
American male marathon runners
Athletes (track and field) at the 1995 Pan American Games
Pan American Games track and field athletes for the United States
20th-century American people